Nelson Saldana is a former American track cycling Champion originally from Kew Gardens, Queens, New York.
Saldana was a Gold Medal winner in the Team Pursuit at the 1975 Pan American Games He was also the 1977 USA Men's Point Race National Champion as well as 1972 Junior Men's track champion.

In 2006 Nelson Saldana was inducted into the Lehigh Valley Velodrome's Hall of Fame.

New York State Trooper 
In 1996, as a New York State Police diver, Saldana participated in the investigation of the crash of TWA Flight 800.

References

External links

Vlex.com

Living people
American male cyclists
People from Kew Gardens, Queens
American track cyclists
Year of birth missing (living people)
Cyclists at the 1975 Pan American Games
Pan American Games gold medalists for the United States
Pan American Games medalists in cycling
Medalists at the 1975 Pan American Games